Dürdane Altunel (born 1995 in Konya) is a Turkish taekwondo practitioner competing in the lightweight division.

She began taekwondo in 2007 at the age of 12 in Selçuklu, Konya by invitation of her brother's taekwondo trainer.

Dürdane Altunel won a bronze medal at the 2011 World Taekwondo Championships held in Gyeongju, South Korea. At the 2013 Islamic Solidarity Games held in Palembang, Indonesia, she won the gold medal in the -62 kg division.

See also
 Turkish women in sports

References

1995 births
Sportspeople from Konya
Turkish female taekwondo practitioners
Living people
Turkish female martial artists
World Taekwondo Championships medalists
Islamic Solidarity Games competitors for Turkey
Islamic Solidarity Games medalists in taekwondo
20th-century Turkish sportswomen
21st-century Turkish sportswomen